Bholu may refer to:
 Bholu (mascot), Indian railways mascot
 Bholu Pahalwan, a Pakistani wrestler
 Bholu Brothers, a tag team in professional wrestling